Label SJ is an exclusive label established by South Korean record label SM Entertainment for boy band Super Junior on November 6, 2015.

History
On 6 November 2015, Super Junior's 10th anniversary since their debut, SM Entertainment announced that Super Junior had their own exclusive label management, Label SJ. SM stated, "We established Label SJ to give Super Junior our wholehearted support and an ideal system for managing the group." Though the new label will be affiliated with SM, it will be independently and wholly responsible for Super Junior's management, producing their albums, and all group, unit, and individual activities.

Artists
Groups
 Super Junior

Sub-units
 Super Junior-K.R.Y.
 Super Junior-T
 Super Junior-M
 Super Junior-H
 Super Junior-D&E

Soloists
 Heechul
 Yesung
 Donghae
 Ryeowook
 Kyuhyun
 Sungmin
 Zhou Mi
Others
 Kangin

Former artists
Super Junior-M
Henry (2015–2018)
Kim Heechul & Kim Jungmo (2015–2019)
Kim Jung-mo (2015–2019)

Discography

Filmography

Notes

References

External links
 Super Junior official website 

SM Entertainment subsidiaries
Super Junior